Antón Arieta-Araunabeña Piedra (6 January 1946 – 7 May 2022), known as Arieta, was a Spanish footballer who played as a striker.

Club career
Born in Durango, Biscay, Arieta played youth football with local Athletic Bilbao. At the age of 18, he was immediately promoted from Lezama into the first team, scoring a career-best 12 goals in the 1964–65 season to help his team to the seventh position in La Liga.

During his ten-year stint at the San Mamés Stadium, Arieta appeared in 358 games in all competitions, netting 83 times. He won two Copa del Rey trophies with his main club, scoring in the 1972–73 edition, won 2–0 against CD Castellón.

In summer 1974, Arieta signed with Hércules CF also of the top division. After only one goal in 12 matches in his second year, he retired at the age of 30.

International career
Arieta earned seven caps for Spain in 23 months. His debut came on 11 February 1970, and he scored two of his four goals for his country in a 2–0 friendly win over West Germany in Seville.

Personal life
Arieta's older brother, Eneko, was also a footballer and a forward. He too played for Athletic, and as the pair shared teams for two years, they were known as Arieta I and Arieta II.

Arieta died on 7 May 2022, aged 76.

Honours
Athletic Bilbao
Copa del Generalísimo: 1969, 1972–73

References

External links

1946 births
2022 deaths
People from Durango, Biscay
Sportspeople from Biscay
Spanish footballers
Footballers from the Basque Country (autonomous community)
Association football forwards
La Liga players
Athletic Bilbao footballers
Hércules CF players
Spain B international footballers
Spain international footballers